Andrej Rendla (born 13 October 1990) is a retired Slovak footballer who played as a forward.

Career

Early career
Rendla debuted in professional football one day after his 16th birthday for Dukla Banská Bystrica. Because of the low age he had, he was the youngest player to debut in the Slovak Superliga ever. In 21 league matches, he scored 1 goal, and he soon attracted attention by FC Twente. In the summer of 2007, Rendla signed a youth contract with Twente.

FC Twente 
Rendla's year in FC Twente's youth was very successful with many wins, including a Youth Super Cup victory, where Rendla scored 2 goals in the final against De Graafschap's youth team. On 25 November 2007, Rendla made his debut in the Dutch league, being a substitute for Stein Huysegems in the away match against Sparta Rotterdam. He came into the pitch in the 68th minute.

In January 2008, he suffered a knee ligament injury, which will sidelined him until the end of the year. In the 2009–10 pre-season, he was back in FC Twente's squad.

Honours

Club 
FC Twente
Eredivisie: 2009–10
Johan Cruijff Schaal: 2011

References

External links
 Voetbal International profile 

1990 births
Living people
Sportspeople from Banská Bystrica
Slovak footballers
FK Dukla Banská Bystrica players
FC Twente players
Heracles Almelo players
FK Železiarne Podbrezová players
Slovak Super Liga players
Eredivisie players
Slovak expatriate footballers
Expatriate footballers in the Netherlands
Slovak expatriate sportspeople in the Netherlands
Association football forwards
Jong FC Twente players